The Israeli government is accused by international, Israeli and Palestinian rights groups of committing the crime of apartheid under the 2002 Rome Statute of the International Criminal Court, both in the occupied Palestinian territories and, by some, in Israel proper. Israel and its supporters deny the charges.

In December 2019, the Committee on the Elimination of Racial Discrimination determined that it has jurisdiction over the complaint the State of Palestine has filed against Israel for breaches of its obligations under the International Convention on the Elimination of All Forms of Racial Discrimination (ICERD) and would commence a review of the Palestinian complaint that Israel's policies in the West Bank amount to apartheid. Soon after this, two Israeli human rights NGOs, Yesh Din (July 2020), and B'Tselem (January 2021) issued separate reports that concluded, in the latter's words, that "the bar for labeling the Israeli regime as apartheid has been met." In April 2021, Human Rights Watch became the first major international human rights body to claim Israel had crossed the threshold, after decades of warnings, and accused Israeli officials of the crimes of apartheid and persecution under international law, calling for an International Criminal Court investigation, becoming the first major international rights NGO to do so. Amnesty International issued a similar report on 1 February 2022.

In March 2022, Michael Lynk, a Canadian law professor appointed by the U.N. Human Rights Council, said that the situation met the legal definition of apartheid, the first time that a U.N.-appointed rapporteur has made the accusation so unequivocally. He said the two-tier legal system Israel enforces "enshrined a system of domination by Israelis over Palestinians that could no longer be explained as the unintended consequence of a temporary occupation." His successor, Francesca Albanese, in her report of October 2022, called for the UN General Assembly to "develop a plan to end the Israeli settler-colonial occupation and apartheid regime". Following the release of its second report in October 2022, Permanent United Nations Fact Finding Mission on the Israel Palestine conflict chair Navi Pillay told the Times of Israel in an interview that apartheid was "a manifestation of the occupation" and "We’re focusing on the root cause, which is the occupation, and part of it lies in apartheid". At the end of December 2022, the United Nations General Assembly (UNGA) adopted a resolution requesting an advisory opinion from the International Court of Justice (ICJ), asking, "How do Israel’s policies and practices....affect the legal status of the occupation and what are the legal consequences that arise for all States and the United Nations from this status?"

Comparisons between Israel-Palestine and South African apartheid were prevalent in the mid-1990s and early 2000s. Since the definition of apartheid as a crime in 2002 Rome Statute, attention has shifted to the question of international law. These specific accusations have been debated by scholars and lawyers, United Nations investigators, the African National Congress (ANC), human rights groups, and several Israeli former politicians. Israel, a number of Western governments and other organizations and scholars have rejected the charges. Critics argue that the accusation is factually and morally inaccurate and intended to delegitimize Israel. Those who support the accusations hold that certain laws explicitly or implicitly discriminate on the basis of creed or race, in effect privileging Jewish citizens and disadvantaging non-Jewish, and particularly Arab, citizens. These include the Law of Return, the 2003 Citizenship and Entry into Israel Law, and many laws regarding security, land and planning, citizenship, political representation in the Knesset (legislature), education and culture. The Nation-State Law, enacted in 2018, was widely condemned in both Israel and internationally as discriminatory, and has also been called an "apartheid law" by members of the Palestine Liberation Organization (PLO), opposition MPs, and other Arab and Jewish Israelis.

Historical comparisons
In 1961, the South African prime minister and architect of South Africa's apartheid policies, Hendrik Verwoerd, dismissed an Israeli vote against South African apartheid at the United Nations, saying, "Israel is not consistent in its new anti-apartheid attitude ... they took Israel away from the Arabs after the Arabs lived there for a thousand years. In that, I agree with them. Israel, like South Africa, is an apartheid state." His successor John Vorster held the same view. Since then, a number of sources have used the apartheid analogy. In the early 1970s, Arabic language magazines of the Palestine Liberation Organization (PLO) and Popular Front for the Liberation of Palestine (PFLP) compared the Israeli proposals for Palestinian autonomy to the Bantustan strategy of South Africa. In 1970, an anti-apartheid activist in the UK's Liberal Party, Louis Eaks, referred to the situation in Israel as "apartheid" and was threatened with expulsion as a result.

In 1979, the Palestinian sociologist Elia Zureik argued in his book The Palestinians in Israel A Study in Internal Colonialism that while not de jure an apartheid state, Israeli society was characterized by a latent form of apartheid. The concept emerged with some frequency in both academic and activist writings in the 1980s–90s, when Uri Davis, Meron Benvenisti, Richard Locke and Anthony Stewart used the term "apartheid" to describe Israel's treatment of the Palestinians.

In the 1990s, the term "Israeli apartheid" gained prominence after Israel, as a result of the Oslo Accords, granted the Palestinians limited self-government in the form of the Palestinian Authority and established a system of permits and checkpoints in the Palestinian Territories. The apartheid analogy gained additional traction after Israel constructed the West Bank Barrier.

In 2001, an NGO Forum ran separately from the World Conference against Racism in the nearby Kingsmead Stadium in Durban, from 28 August to 1 September. It consisted of 3,000 NGOs and was attended by 8,000 representatives. The declaration the NGO Forum adopted was not an official document of the conference. The final NGO document called "for the reinstitution of the UN resolution equating Zionism with racism" and "the complete and total isolation of Israel as an apartheid state".

By 2013, the analogy between the West Bank and Bantustans of apartheid-era South Africa was widely drawn in international circles. In the U.S., where the notion had previously been taboo, Israel's rule over the occupied territories was increasingly compared to apartheid.

Crime of apartheid and Israel

The legal standard 
The United Nations General Assembly adopted the International Convention on the Suppression and Punishment of the Crime of Apartheid (ICSPCA) in 1973. The ICSPCA defines apartheid as "inhuman acts committed for the purpose of establishing and maintaining domination by one racial group ... over another racial group ... and systematically oppressing them".

The crime of apartheid was further defined in 2002 by Article 7 of the Rome Statute of the International Criminal Court as encompassing inhumane acts such as torture, murder, forcible transfer, imprisonment, or persecution of an identifiable group on political, racial, national, ethnic, cultural, religious, or other grounds, "committed in the context of an institutionalized regime of systematic oppression and domination by one racial group over any racial group or groups and committed with the intention of maintaining that regime".

At Israel's 5-yearly Universal Periodic Review in January 2018, Human Rights Watch and other rights groups criticized Israel. Human Rights Watch's Geneva Director John Fisher said, "Israel's professed commitment to human rights during its UN review is belied by its unwillingness to address human rights violations in the context of the occupation, the rights of Palestinians, or illegal settlement activity." Ahead of the review, eight Palestinian human rights organizations submitted a joint 60-page report detailing "Israel’s creation of an institutionalised regime of systematic racial domination and oppression over the Palestinian people as a whole, which amounts to the crime of apartheid, in violation of Article 3 of the International Convention on the Elimination of All Forms of Racial Discrimination".

CERD

On 23 April 2018, Palestine filed an inter-state complaint against Israel for breaches of its obligations under the ICERD. On 12 December 2019, the Committee on the Elimination of Racial Discrimination decided that it has jurisdiction over the complaint and would begin a review of the Palestinian complaint that Israel's policies in the West Bank amount to apartheid. The committee also expressed concern that Israel had not adopted a legal definition of racial discrimination and issued a number of recommendations. On 30 April 2021, the Committee rejected the exceptions raised about the admissibility of inter-state communication and requested the creation of an ad hoc Conciliation Commission with a view "to an amicable solution of the matter on the basis of States parties’ compliance with the convention." The ad hoc Conciliation Commission will issue a report, to be distributed among all state parties to ICERD. On 17 February 2022, CERD set up the commission, composed of five human rights experts from the Committee, Verene Shepherd, Gün Kut (chair), Pansy Tlakula, Chinsung Chung and Michał Balcerzak. On 4–5 May 2022, the Commission held its first in-person meeting and published its Rules of Procedure.

Opinions on applicability

Report of U.N. Special Rapporteur for Palestine
In a 2007 report, U.N. Special Rapporteur for Palestine John Dugard wrote, "elements of the Israeli occupation constitute forms of colonialism and of apartheid, which are contrary to international law" and suggested that the "legal consequences of a prolonged occupation with features of colonialism and apartheid" be put to the International Court of Justice.

Legal study of the South African Human Sciences Research Council
Following Dugard's report, the Human Sciences Research Council (HSRC) of South Africa commissioned a legal study, completed in 2009, of Israel's practices in the occupied Palestinian territories under international law. The report noted that one of South African apartheid's most "notorious" aspects was the "racial enclave policy" manifested in the Black Homelands called bantustans, and added: "As the apartheid regime in South Africa, Israel justifies these measures under the pretext of 'security'. Contrary to such claims, they are in fact part of an overall regime aimed at preserving demographic superiority of one racial group over the other in certain areas". According to the report, Israel's practices in the occupied Palestinian territories correlate almost entirely with the definition of apartheid as established in Article 2 of the International Convention on the Suppression and Punishment of the Crime of Apartheid. Comparison to South African laws and practices by the apartheid regime also found strong correlations with Israeli practices, including violations of international standards for due process (such as illegal detention); discriminatory privileges based on ascribed ethnicity (legally, as Jewish or non-Jewish); draconian enforced ethnic segregation in all parts of life, including by confining groups to ethnic "reserves and ghettoes"; comprehensive restrictions on individual freedoms, such as movement and expression; a dual legal system based on ethno-national identity (Jewish or Palestinian); denationalization (denial of citizenship); and a special system of laws designed selectively to punish any Palestinian resistance to the system. The study found: "the State of Israel exercises control in the Occupied Palestinian Territories with the purpose of maintaining a system of domination by Jews over Palestinians and that this system constitutes a breach of the prohibition of apartheid." The report was published in 2012 as Beyond Occupation: Apartheid, Colonialism and International Law in the Occupied Palestinian Territories.

2014 report of UN Special Rapporteur
In 2014, United Nations Special Rapporteur Richard A. Falk used the term in his "Report of the Special Rapporteur on the situation of human rights in the Palestinian territories occupied since 1967".

ESCWA Report
A 2017 report was "commissioned and approved by the UN but has not obtained an official endorsement from the Secretary General of the UN. Hence, it does not represent the views of the UN." Author Seada Hussein Adem discusses "the issue of apartheid on its own merits, in light of the Rome Statute and the Apartheid Convention" while acknowledging the analogy and taking "precaution to avoid using the discrete cases in apartheid South Africa as a yardstick to qualify conducts as amounting to the crime of apartheid", referring the reader to pages 14 to 17 of the 2017 report. At the time of publication, Rima Khalaf, then UN Under-Secretary General and ESCWA Executive Secretary, said the report “clearly and frankly concludes that Israel is a racist state that has established an apartheid system that persecutes the Palestinian people”. The ESCWA comprises 18 Arab countries.

Yesh Din
In 2020, the Israeli human rights organization Yesh Din found that Israeli treatment of the West Bank's Palestinian population meets the definition of the crime of apartheid under both Article 7 of the 2002 Rome Statute which established the International Criminal Court (ICC) and the International Convention on the Suppression and Punishment of the Crime of Apartheid (ICSPCA) adopted by the United Nations General Assembly, which entered into force in 1976.

B'tselem report
In January 2021, Israeli human rights organization B'Tselem issued a report outlining the considerations that led to the conclusion that "the bar for labeling the Israeli regime as apartheid has been met." In presenting the report, B'Tselem Executive Director Hagai El-Ad said, "Israel is not a democracy that has a temporary occupation attached to it: it is one regime between the Jordan River and the Mediterranean Sea, and we must look at the full picture and see it for what it is: apartheid."

Human Rights Watch report
In April 2021, Human Rights Watch released a report accusing Israeli officials of the crimes of apartheid and persecution under international law and calling on the International Criminal Court to investigate "systematic discrimination" against Palestinians, becoming the first major international rights NGO to do so. Its report said that Israeli authorities "have dispossessed, confined, forcibly separated, and subjugated Palestinians by virtue of their identity to varying degrees of intensity" and that "in certain areas ... these deprivations are so severe that they amount to the crimes against humanity of apartheid and persecution." Israel rejected the report, with Strategic Affairs Minister Michael Biton saying: "The purpose of this spurious report is in no way related to human rights, but to an ongoing attempt by HRW to undermine the State of Israel's right to exist as the nation state of the Jewish people." Palestinian Prime Minister Mohammad Shtayyeh welcomed the Human Rights Watch report, urging the ICC to investigate Israeli officials “implicated in the crimes against humanity of apartheid or persecution”. The U.S. State Department came out against the HRW report, stating, "It is not the view of this administration that Israel's actions constitute apartheid."

PLO report
On 8 June 2021, the Palestine Liberation Organization released a report titled It is Apartheid: The Reality of Israel's Colonial Occupation of Palestine.

Amnesty report
On 1 February 2022, Amnesty International published a report, Israel's Apartheid Against Palestinians: Cruel System of Domination and Crime Against Humanity, which stated that Israeli practices in Israel and the occupied territories equate to apartheid and that territorial fragmentation of the Palestinians "serves as a foundational element of the regime of oppression and domination". The report states that, taken together, Israeli practices, including land expropriation, unlawful killings, forced displacement, restrictions on movement, and denial of citizenship rights amount to the crime of apartheid. The report suggested the International Criminal Court include the crime of apartheid as part of its investigations. Even before its release, Israeli officials condemned the report as "false and biased" and antisemitic, accusations that Amnesty secretary general Agnes Callamard dismissed as "baseless attacks, barefaced lies, fabrications on the messenger". The Anti-Defamation League criticized the report, saying, "Amnesty International's allegations that Israel's crimes go back to the sin of its creation in 1948, serve to present the Jewish and democratic state as singularly illegitimate at its foundational roots." The U.S. State Department also rejected the report's conclusions, calling them "absurd", and added: "it is important, as the world's only Jewish state, that the Jewish people must not be denied their right to self-determination, and we must ensure there isn't a double standard being applied." German Foreign Ministry spokesperson Christopher Burger said, "We reject expressions like apartheid or a one-sided focusing of criticism on Israel. That is not helpful to solving the conflict in the Middle East". A spokesperson for the U.K.'s Foreign and Commonwealth Development Office said, "we do not agree with the use of this terminology". The Dutch foreign minister responded by saying his government "does not agree with Amnesty’s conclusion that there is apartheid in Israel or the territories occupied by Israel." J Street, a nonprofit liberal organization, did not endorse the use of the term apartheid, while discouraging labeling those who use the term "antisemitic". Thirteen Israeli human rights organizations issued a statement defending Amnesty and the report. Omar Shakir, the Israel and Palestine director of Human Rights Watch, which produced a similar report in 2021, said, "There is certainly a consensus in the international human rights movement that Israel is committing apartheid." The Arab League and the OIC welcomed the report, while the Palestinian Authority said in a statement, "The State of Palestine welcomes the report by Amnesty International on Israel's apartheid regime and racist policies and practices against the Palestinian people".

2022 report of UN Special Rapporteur
On 21 March 2022, Michael Lynk, the UN's Special Rapporteur for Human Rights in the Occupied Palestinian Territories submitted a report to the U.N. Human Rights Council stating that Israel's control over the West Bank and Gaza Strip amounts to apartheid, an "institutionalised regime of systematic racial oppression and discrimination." The Israeli Foreign Ministry and other Israeli and Jewish organizations called Lynk hostile to Israel and the report baseless. In January, Foreign Minister Yair Lapid warned that 2022 would see intense efforts to call Israeli policy apartheid.

2022 special committee on Israeli practices
The report of the Special Committee to Investigate Israeli Practices Affecting the Human Rights of the Palestinian People was published on 15 July 2022, following its annual mission to Amman, Jordan, from 4 to 7 July 2022. The Special Committee stated, "By design, Israel’s 55-year occupation of Palestine has been used as a vehicle to serve and protect the interest of a Jewish State and its Jewish people, while subjugating Palestinians", and "Many stakeholders consider that this practice amounts to apartheid."

2022 report of new UN Special Rapporteur
On 18 October 2022, the United Nations Special Rapporteur on the occupied Palestinian territories recommended in a report that UN member states develop "a plan to end the Israeli settler-colonial occupation and apartheid regime" and concluded that "The violations described in the present report expose the nature of the Israeli occupation, that of an intentionally acquisitive, segregationist and repressive regime designed to prevent the realization of the Palestinian people’s right to self-determination".

2022 ICC submission by Dawn
The U.S.-based NGO Democracy for the Arab World Now (DAWN) filed a complaint with the ICC against senior Israeli military lawyer Eyal Toledano for war crimes and crimes against humanity, including apartheid. The submission follows a months-long investigation by the NGO into incidents in the West Bank between 2016 and 2020 and falls within the scope of the current International Criminal Court investigation in Palestine. DAWN Executive Director Sarah Leah Whitson said, "The international legal community, democracies across the world, and in particular the signatories of the Apartheid Convention and Rome Statute have an obligation to reject Israeli apartheid by holding Toledano accountable for his culpability in the crime of apartheid". The Israeli military said it "thoroughly rejects" the claims, which it called "baseless".

Overview of reports 
Human rights lawyer and B'tselem director Smadar Ben-Natan analyzed the different reports in terms of temporal and spatial framing, whether they look at the situation from 1948 or from 1967, and whether they include Israel. ESCWA and the Palestinian NGOs take a very broad approach, "arguing that apartheid exists in the entire territory under Israeli control since 1948, being the constitutive logic of the State of Israel (raison d’état)", while Yesh Din focuses only on the occupied territories post-1967. B'tselem includes Israel but limits its scope to post-1967 while the HRW report differs from it in finding that while "the elements of systematic and widespread repression with the intention of maintaining the superiority of one group exist both within Israel and in the OPT, only in the OPT (including East Jerusalem) does the severity of inhumane acts make them criminal." The Amnesty report is "the only report explicitly arguing that crimes of apartheid have been perpetrated inside Israel since 1948, and accordingly considers many Israeli policies as falling under the category of inhumane acts". The U.N. Special Rapporteur report follows the mandate given and examines only the occupied territory, concluding "that Israel’s occupation has turned into a system of apartheid, and that the crime of apartheid is being committed."

According to author Ran Greenstein, "Two features are shared by all the reports: they agree that apartheid is a relevant, indeed essential, concept for the analysis of Israeli rule, and they focus on legal analysis and political arrangements, paying scant attention to social and historical aspects of the evolution of Israeli, Palestinian, and South African societies."

Additional views
The question of whether Israelis and Palestinians can be said to constitute "racial groups" has been a point of contention in regard to the applicability of the ICSPCA and Article 7 of the Rome Statute. The HSRC's 2009 report states that in the Occupied Palestinian Territories, Jewish and Palestinian identities are "socially constructed as groups distinguished by ancestry or descent as well as nationality, ethnicity, and religion". On this basis, the study concludes that Israeli Jews and Palestinian Arabs can be considered "racial groups" for the purposes of the definition of apartheid in international law.

In 2017, Jacques De Maio, then Head of Delegation of the International Committee of the Red Cross, Israel and the Occupied Territories, denied there is apartheid, saying there is "no regime of superiority of race, of denial of basic human rights to a group of people because of their alleged racial inferiority. There is a bloody national conflict, whose most prominent and tragic characteristic is its continuation over the years, decades-long, and there is a state of occupation. Not apartheid."

In an opinion survey commissioned by the Jewish Electorate Institute following the 2021 Israel–Palestine crisis, 34% agreed that "Israel’s treatment of Palestinians is similar to racism in the United States," 25% agreed that "Israel is an apartheid state” and 22% agreed that "Israel is committing genocide against the Palestinians." The percentages were higher among younger voters, of whom more than a third agreed that Israel is an apartheid state.

On 8 June 2021, two former Israeli ambassadors to South Africa, Ilan Baruch and Alon Liel, wrote in an opinion piece for South African news website GroundUp, "It is time for the world to recognize that what we saw in South Africa decades ago is happening in the occupied Palestinian territories too."

On 29 June 2021, Ban Ki-moon, UN secretary general from 2007 to the end of 2016, in an opinion piece for the Financial Times, stated "This gives the dual legal regimes imposed in Palestinian territories by Israel—together with the inhumane and abusive acts that are carried out against Palestinians—new significance, resulting in a situation that arguably constitutes apartheid,".

On 18 July 2021, the General Synod of the United Church of Christ adopted a resolution, denounced by the American Jewish Committee, that, among other criticism, refers to Israel's "apartheid system of laws and legal procedures".

An August 2021 survey found that 65% of academic experts on the Middle East described Israel as a "one-state reality akin to apartheid." Seven months earlier, that percentage was 59%. The increase in only seven months was potentially attributed to two notable events that occurred between the two surveys: the crisis in Israel following planned evictions of Palestinians in East Jerusalem pointing up the unequal treatment of Jews and Palestinians under Israeli control and the subsequent 2021 Israel-Palestine crisis, and the issue of two widely read reports by the Israeli-based B’Tselem and the U.S.-based Human Rights Watch arguing respectively that there is an apartheid reality in Israel and the Palestinian territories and that Israel's behavior fits the legal definition of apartheid.

Israeli Arab party leader Mansour Abbas, whose Islamic Raam Party is a member of the Israeli Knesset's ruling coalition, commenting on the Amnesty report, said "I would not call it apartheid". Issawi Frej, an Arab member of the Knesset, said that "Israel has many problems that must be solved, inside the Green Line and certainly in the occupied territories, but Israel is not an apartheid state."

Former Attorney General of Israel Michael Ben-Yair said, "It is with great sadness that I must also conclude that my country has sunk to such political and moral depths that it is now an apartheid regime. It is time for the international community to recognise this reality as well."

In March 2021, the International Federation for Human Rights (FIDH) issued a statement arguing that "The international community must hold Israel responsible for its crimes of apartheid", citing the work of its member organizations in Israel and Palestine. In March 2022, the International Commission of Jurists "strongly condemns Israel’s laws, policies and practices of racial segregation, persecution and apartheid against the indigenous Palestinian population in Israel and in the Occupied Palestinian Territories (OPT), comprising the Gaza Strip and the West Bank, including East Jerusalem, and against Palestinian refugees".

In a 6 June 2022 editorial, Israeli newspaper Haaretz wrote that Israeli settlements are made possible due to a "mechanism that maintains apartheid in the West Bank"; the editorial mentions "the existence of two separate legal systems in the same territory, one for Israelis (that is, Jews) and one for Palestinians, as well as two separate justice systems. There's a military justice system for subjects without [Israeli] citizenship who live under a military dictatorship, and there's a second system for privileged Jews with Israeli citizenship, who live under Israeli law in a territory that’s not under Israeli sovereignty".

On 28 June 2022, the US Presbyterian Church passed a resolution stating that "Israel's laws, policies and practices regarding the Palestinian people fulfill the international legal definition of apartheid".

On 8 September 2022, the World Council of Churches adopted a statement that included a call for "The WCC to study, discuss and discern the implications of the recent reports by B'tselem, Human Rights Watch and Amnesty International, and for its governing bodies to respond appropriately." After much debate, the statement also read, "Recently, numerous international, Israeli and Palestinian human rights organizations and legal bodies have published studies and reports describing the policies and actions of Israel as amounting to 'apartheid' under international law. Within this Assembly, some churches and delegates strongly support the utilization of this term as accurately describing the reality of the people in Palestine/Israel and the position under international law, while others find it inappropriate, unhelpful and painful. We are not of one mind on this matter".

On 28 September 2022, Al-Haq hosted representatives of the International Federation for Human Rights, Amnesty International, and Human Rights Watch in Ramallah. Referring to Israel's outlawing of Palestinian NGOs, Amnesty International’s France director of campaigns Nathalie Godard said: "The repression of Palestinian civic space is part of the system of apartheid. Not only are Palestinians under Israeli military occupation, conducted with manifold violations of international humanitarian law and human rights law, but then also those organizations and human rights defenders who seek to assist people in need are shut down."

On 30 December 2022, Massachusetts state representative Jamie Belsito, who represents the 4th Essex district, said: "The US must acknowledge that the [Israeli] administration is an apartheid-run thuggery terrorist regime on a mission to kill Palestinians."

On 13 January 2023, in response to questions from the EU parliament, EU high representative for foreign affairs and security policy Josep Borrell wrote, "The Commission is aware of the reports referred to by the Honourable Members and is giving them due attention. In any case, the Commission considers that it is not appropriate to use the term apartheid in connection with the State of Israel." In response, 12 Israeli human rights organizations including B'tselem and Yesh Din, issued a statement condemning Borrell's remarks and calling on the EU Commission "to engage with the facts on which legal designations of apartheid regarding various aspects of Israel's treatment of Palestinians are based, and to reconsider its position in this regard."

On 8 February 2023, the mayor of Barcelona cut ties with Israeli institutions "due to its 'apartheid policy' towards Palestinians" and announced that the city is no longer twinned with Tel Aviv. In response, Madrid's mayor offered to partner with Tel Aviv instead, denouncing Barcelona's move as having a "clear antisemitic overtone".

Israel proper
Adam and Moodley wrote in 2006 that Israeli Palestinians are "restricted to second-class citizen status when another ethnic group monopolizes state power" because of legal prohibitions on access to land, as well as the unequal allocation of civil service positions and per capita expenditure on educations between "dominant and minority citizens."

Fifty-three faculty members from Stanford University signed a letter in 2008 expressing the view that "the State of Israel has nothing in common with apartheid" within its national territory. They argued that Israel is a liberal democracy in which Arab citizens of Israel enjoy civil, religious, social, and political equality. They said that likening Israel to apartheid South Africa was a "smear" and part of a campaign of "malicious propaganda".

South African Judge Richard Goldstone, writing in The New York Times in October 2011, said that while there exists a degree of separation between Israeli Jews and Arabs, "in Israel, there is no apartheid. Nothing there comes close to the definition of apartheid under the 1998 Rome Statute". Goldstone wrote that the situation in the West Bank "is more complex. But here too there is no intent to maintain 'an institutionalized regime of systematic oppression and domination by one racial group'." Goldstone also wrote in The New York Times, "the charge that Israel is an apartheid state is a false and malicious one that precludes, rather than promotes, peace and harmony."

Hafrada–apartheid comparison

Hafrada ( literally "separation") is the Israeli government's official term for the policy of separating the Palestinian population in Palestinian territories from the Israeli population. In Israel, the term is used to refer to the general policy of separation the Israeli government has adopted and implemented over the Palestinians in the West Bank and Gaza Strip. The word has been compared to "apartheid" by scholars and commentators, with some claiming that hafrada is equivalent to apartheid.
 
The Israeli West Bank barrier ("separation fence"), the associated controls on the movement of Palestinians posed by West Bank Closures, and Israel's unilateral disengagement from Gaza have been cited as examples of hafrada.

Since its first public introductions, the concept-turned-policy or paradigm of hafrada has dominated Israeli political and cultural discourse and debate. In 2009, Israeli historian Benny Morris said that those that equate Israeli efforts to separate the two populations to apartheid are effectively trying to undermine the legitimacy of any peace agreement based on a two-state solution. In 2023, former Human Rights Watch director Kenneth Roth said that his organization had long refrained from interpreting the reality on the ground in terms of apartheid as long as there was a chance the peace process would succeed. Since, in his view, the process is going nowhere and the Israeli government is undermining a two-state solution, Roth concluded that Israel's policies in the West Bank have "all the elements of the oppressive discrimination that constitute apartheid". Former Foreign Policy editor David Rothkopf has called Israel an apartheid state.

Land
There has been a steady extension of Israeli Arab rights to lease or purchase land formerly restricted to Jewish applicants, such as that owned by the Jewish National Fund or the Jewish Agency. These groups, established by Jews during the Ottoman period to aid in building up a viable Jewish community in Ottoman Palestine, purchased land, including arid desert and swamps, that could be reclaimed, leased to and farmed by Jews, thus encouraging Jewish immigration. After the establishment of the state of Israel, the Israel Lands Authority oversaw the administration of these properties. On 8 March 2000, the Israeli Supreme Court ruled that Israeli Arabs, too, had an equal right to purchase long-term leases of such land, even inside previously solely Jewish communities and villages. The court ruled that the government may not allocate land based on religion or ethnicity and may not prevent Arab citizens from living wherever they choose: "The principle of equality prohibits the state from distinguishing between its citizens on the basis of religion or nationality," Chief Justice Aharon Barak wrote. "The principle also applies to the allocation of state land.... The Jewish character of the state does not permit Israel to discriminate between its citizens." In a book chapter dealing with the "apartheid Israel" accusation, the British philosopher Bernard Harrison has written: "No doubt much more needs to be done. But we are discussing, remember, the question of whether Israel is, or is not, an 'apartheid state'. It is not merely hard, but impossible, to imagine the South African Supreme Court, under the premiership of Hendrik Verwoerd, say, delivering an analogous decision, because to have done so would have struck at the root of the entire system of apartheid, which was nothing if not a system for separating the races by separating the areas they were permitted to occupy."

In 2006, Chris McGreal of The Guardian stated that as a result of the government's control over most of the land in Israel, the vast majority of land in Israel is not available to non-Jews. In 2007 in response to a 2004 petition filed by Adalah, the Legal Center for Arab Minority Rights in Israel, Attorney General Menachem Mazuz ruled that the policy was discriminatory, it has been ruled that the JNF must sell land to non-Jews, and will be compensated with other land for any such land to ensure that the overall amount of Jewish-owned land in Israel remains unchanged.

Community settlements legislation

In the early 2000s, several community settlements in the Negev and the Galilee were accused of barring Arab applicants from moving in. In 2010, the Knesset passed legislation that allowed admissions committees to function in smaller communities in the Galilee and the Negev, while explicitly forbidding committees to bar applicants on the basis of race, religion, sex, ethnicity, disability, personal status, age, parenthood, sexual orientation, country of origin, political views, or political affiliation. Critics say the law gives the privately run admissions committees wide latitude over public lands, and believe it will worsen discrimination against the Arab minority.

Israeli citizenship law
The Knesset passed the Citizenship and Entry into Israel Law in 2003 as an emergency measure after Israel had suffered its worst ever spate of suicide bombings and after several Palestinians who had been granted permanent residency on the grounds of family reunification took part in terrorist attacks in Israel. The law makes inhabitants of Iran, Afghanistan, Lebanon, Libya, Sudan, Syria, Iraq, Pakistan, Yemen, and areas governed by the Palestinian Authority ineligible for the automatic granting of Israeli citizenship and residency permits that is usually available through marriage to an Israeli citizen. This applies equally to a spouse of any Israeli citizen, whether Arab or Jewish, but in practice the law mostly affects Palestinian Israelis living in the towns bordering the West Bank. The law was intended to be temporary but has since been extended annually.

The law was upheld in May 2006, by the Supreme Court of Israel on a six to five vote. Israel's Chief Justice, Aharon Barak, sided with the minority on the bench, declaring: "This violation of rights is directed against Arab citizens of Israel. As a result, therefore, the law is a violation of the right of Arab citizens in Israel to equality." Zehava Gal-On, one of the founders of B'Tselem and a Knesset member with the Meretz-Yachad party, stated that with the ruling "The Supreme Court could have taken a braver decision and not relegated us to the level of an apartheid state." The law was also criticized by Amnesty International and Human Rights Watch. In 2007, the restriction was expanded to citizens of Iran, Iraq, Syria and Lebanon.

Adam and Moodley cite the marriage law as an example of how Arab Israelis "resemble in many ways 'Colored' and Indian South Africans". They write: "Both Israeli Palestinians and Colored and Indian South Africans are restricted to second-class citizen status when another ethnic group monopolizes state power, treats the minorities as intrinsically suspect, and legally prohibits their access to land or allocates civil service positions or per capita expenditure on education differentially between dominant and minority citizens."

In June 2008, after the law was extended for another year, Amos Schocken, the publisher of the Israeli daily Haaretz, wrote in an opinion article that the law severely discriminates when comparing the rights of young Israeli Jewish citizens and young Israeli Arab citizens who marry, and that its existence in the law books turns Israel into an apartheid state.

Education

Separate and unequal education systems were a central part of apartheid in South Africa, as part of a deliberate strategy designed to limit black children to a life of manual labor. Some disparities between Jews and Arabs in Israel's education system exist, although according to The Guardian they are not nearly so significant and the intent not so malign. The Israeli Pupils' Rights Law of 2000 prohibits educators from establishing different rights, obligations and disciplinary standards for students of different religions. Educational institutions may not discriminate against religious minorities in admissions or expulsion decisions, or when developing curricula or assigning students to classes. Unlike apartheid South Africa, in Israel, education is free and compulsory for all citizens, from elementary school to the end of high school, and university access is based on uniform tuition for all citizens.

Israel has Hebrew-language and Arabic-language schools, while some schools are bilingual. Most Arabs study in Arabic, while a small number of Arab parents choose to enroll their children in Hebrew schools. All of Israel's eight universities use Hebrew. In 1992 a government report concluded that nearly twice as much money was allocated to each Jewish child as to each Arab pupil. Likewise, a 2004 Human Rights Watch report identified significant disparities in education spending and stated that discrimination against Arab children affects every aspect of the education system. Exam pass-rate for Arab pupils were about one-third lower than that for their Jewish compatriots.

Population Registry Law
Chris McGreal, The Guardian's former chief Israel correspondent, compared Israel's Population Registry Law of 1965, which requires all residents of Israel to register their nationality, to South Africa's Apartheid-era Population Registration Act, which categorized South Africans according to racial definitions in order to determine who could live in what land. According to McGreal, the Israeli identification cards determine where people are permitted to live, affects access to some government welfare programs, and affects how people are likely to be treated by civil servants and policemen.

"Jewish State" bill
The "Jewish State" bill, which passed in July 2018, states that "the right of national self-determination in the state of Israel is unique to the Jewish people". The bill would also allow the establishment of segregated towns in which residency would be restricted by religion or nationality—which has been compared to the 1950 Group Areas Act, which established apartheid in South Africa. Opposition members and other commentators have warned that the bill would establish or consolidate an apartheid regime; a Haaretz editorial called it "a cornerstone of apartheid".

The Ministerial Committee for Legislation unanimously approved the bill in May 2017.

West Bank and Gaza Strip

Under Israeli military occupation
Leila Farsakh, associate professor of political science at University of Massachusetts Boston, has said that after 1977, "the military government in the West Bank and Gaza Strip (WBGS) expropriated and enclosed Palestinian land and allowed the transfer of Israeli settlers to the occupied territories." She notes that settlers continued to be governed by Israeli laws, and that a different system of military law was enacted "to regulate the civilian, economic and legal affairs of Palestinian inhabitants." She says, "[m]any view these Israeli policies of territorial integration and societal separation as apartheid, even if they were never given such a name."

Under Palestinian Authority
Arabs living in the West Bank and Gaza Strip, areas occupied by Israel in the 1967 Six-Day War and deemed to be occupied territory under international law, are under the civil control of the Palestinian Authority, and are not Israeli citizens. In some areas of the West Bank, they are under Israeli security control.

Former U.S. President Jimmy Carter authored the 2006 book Palestine: Peace Not Apartheid. Carter's use of the term "apartheid" was calibrated to avoid specific accusations of racism against the government of Israel, and carefully limited to the situation in Gaza and the West Bank. In a letter to the Board of Rabbis of Greater Phoenix, Carter made clear that he was not discussing the circumstances within Israel but exclusively within Gaza and the West Bank.

In 2007, in advance of a report from the United Nations Human Rights Council, Special Rapporteur John Dugard said that "Israel's laws and practices in the OPT [occupied Palestinian territories] certainly resemble aspects of apartheid." Dugard asked: "Can it seriously be denied that the purpose [...] is to establish and maintain domination by one racial group (Jews) over another racial group (Palestinians) and systematically oppressing them?" In October 2010, Richard A. Falk reported to the General Assembly Third Committee that "the nature of the occupation as of 2010 substantiates earlier allegations of colonialism and apartheid in evidence and law to a greater extent than was the case even three years ago." Falk called it a "cumulative process" and said "the longer it continues...the more serious is the abridgment of fundamental Palestinian rights."

Israeli Defense Minister and former prime minister Ehud Barak said in 2010, "As long as in this territory west of the Jordan River there is only one political entity called Israel it is going to be either non-Jewish, or non-democratic. If this bloc of millions of Palestinians cannot vote, that will be an apartheid state."

Under State of Palestine and Hamas Government in Gaza
In November 2014, former Attorney General of Israel (1993–1996) Michael Ben-Yair urged the European Economic Union to endorse the creation of a Palestinian state, arguing that Israel had imposed an apartheid regime on the West Bank. He stated that the Jews' "national-historical affiliation with the land of Israel" must not come "at the expense of another nation", advocating coexistence. In 2015, Meir Dagan argued that continuation of Israeli Prime Minister Benjamin Netanyahu's policies would result in an Israel that is either a binational state or an apartheid state. Dagan, a former head of the Israeli agency Mossad, said in particular that the Operation Cast Lead military effort in Palestinian territory had failed.

West Bank barrier

In 2003, a year after Operation Defensive Shield, the Israeli government announced a project of "fences and other physical obstacles" to prevent Palestinians crossing into Israel. Several figures, including Mohammad Sarwar, John Pilger, Mustafa Barghouti and others have called the resultant West Bank barrier an "apartheid wall".

Supporters of the West Bank barrier consider it to be largely responsible for reducing incidents of terrorism by 90% from 2002 to 2005. Some Israelis have compared the separation plan to the South African apartheid regime. Political scientist Meron Benvenisti wrote that Israel's disengagement from Gaza created a bantustan model for Gaza. According to Benvenisti, Ariel Sharon's intention to disengage from Gaza only after construction of the fence was completed, "along a route that will include all settlement blocs (in keeping with Binyamin Netanyahus demand), underscores the continuity of the bantustan concept. The fence creates three bantustans on the West Bank: Jenin-Nablus, Bethlehem-Hebron, and Ramallah. He called this "the real link between the Gaza and West Bank plans".

The International Court of Justice ruled in 2004 in an advisory opinion that the wall is illegal where it extends beyond the 1967 Green Line into the West Bank. Israel disagreed with the ruling, but its supreme court subsequently ordered the barrier to be moved in sections where its route was seen to cause more hardship to Palestinians than security concerns could motivate. The Court ruled that the barrier is defensive and accepted the government's position that the route is based on security considerations.

Land
Henry Siegman, a former national director of the American Jewish Congress, has said that the network of settlements in the West Bank has created an "irreversible colonial project" aimed to foreclose the possibility of a viable Palestinian state. According to Siegman, in accomplishing this Israel has "crossed the threshold from 'the only democracy in the Middle East' to the only apartheid regime in the Western world". Siegman argues that denial of both self-determination and Israeli citizenship to Palestinians amounts to a "double disenfranchisement", which when based on ethnicity amounts to racism. He argues that reserving democracy for privileged citizens and keeping others "behind checkpoints and barbed wire fences" is the opposite of democracy.

John Dugard has compared Israel's confiscation of Palestinian farms and land, and destruction of Palestinian homes, to similar policies of Apartheid-era South Africa.

A major 2002 study of Israeli settlement practices by the Israeli human rights organization B'Tselem concluded: "Israel has created in the Occupied Territories a regime of separation based on discrimination, applying two separate systems of law in the same area and basing the rights of individuals on their nationality. This regime is the only one of its kind in the world, and is reminiscent of distasteful regimes from the past, such as the apartheid regime in South Africa.

Criminal law

In 2007, the UN Committee on the Elimination of Racial Discrimination reported that Palestinians and Israeli settlers in the occupied territories are subject to different criminal laws, leading to longer detention and harsher punishments for Palestinians than for Israelis for the same offenses. Amnesty International has reported that in the West Bank, Israeli settlers and soldiers who engage in abuses against Palestinians, including unlawful killings, enjoy "impunity" from punishment and are rarely prosecuted, but Palestinians detained by Israeli security forces may be imprisoned for prolonged periods of time, and reports of their torture and other ill-treatment are not credibly investigated.

Dugard has compared Israeli imprisonment of Palestinians to policies of apartheid-era South Africa, saying, "Apartheid's security police practiced torture on a large scale. So do the Israeli security forces. There were many political prisoners on Robben Island but there are more Palestinian political prisoners in Israeli jails."

Access to water
The World Bank found in 2009 that Israeli settlements in the West Bank (which amount to 15% of the population of the West Bank) are given access to over 80% of its fresh water resources, despite the fact that the Oslo accords call for "joint" management of such resources. This has created, according to the Bank, "real water shortages" for the Palestinians. In January 2012, the Foreign Affairs Committee of the French parliament published a report describing Israel's water policies in the West Bank as "a weapon serving the new apartheid". The report noted that the 450,000 Israeli settlers used more water than the 2.3 million Palestinians, "in contravention of international law", that Palestinians are not allowed to use the underground aquifers, and that Israel was deliberately destroying wells, reservoirs and water purification plants. Israeli Foreign Ministry spokesman Yigal Palmor said the report was "loaded with the language of vicious propaganda, far removed from any professional criticism with which one could argue intelligently". A Begin–Sadat Center for Strategic Studies report concludes that Israel has fulfilled the water agreements it has made with the Palestinians, and the author has commented that the situation is "just the opposite of apartheid" as Israel has provided water infrastructure to more than 700 Palestinian villages. The Association for Civil Rights in Israel concluded in 2008 that a segregated road network in the West Bank, expansion of Jewish settlements, restriction of the growth of Palestinian towns and discriminatory granting of services, budgets and access to natural resources are "a blatant violation of the principle of equality and in many ways reminiscent of the Apartheid regime in South Africa". The group reversed its previous reluctance to use the comparison to South Africa because "things are getting worse rather than better", according to spokeswoman Melanie Takefman.

Travel and movement

Palestinians living in the non-annexed portions of the West Bank do not have Israeli citizenship or voting rights in Israel, but are subject to movement restrictions of the Israeli government. Israel has created roads and checkpoints in the West Bank with the stated purpose of preventing the uninhibited movement of suicide bombers and militants in the region. The human rights NGO B'Tselem has indicated that such policies have isolated some Palestinian communities and state that Israel's road regime "based on the principle of separation through discrimination, bears striking similarities to the racist apartheid regime that existed in South Africa until 1994".

The International Court of Justice stated that the fundamental rights of the Palestinian population of the occupied territories are guaranteed by the International Covenant on Civil and Political Rights, and that Israel could not deny them on the grounds of security. Marwan Bishara, a teacher of international relations at the American University of Paris, has claimed that the restrictions on the movement of goods between Israel and the West Bank are "a de facto apartheid system". Michael Oren argues that none of this even remotely resembles apartheid, since "the vast majority of settlers and Palestinians choose to live apart because of cultural and historical differences, not segregation, though thousands of them do work side by side. The separate roads were created in response to terrorist attacks—not to segregate Palestinians but to save Jewish lives. And Israeli roads are used by Israeli Jews and Arabs alike."

A permit and closure system was introduced in 1990. Leila Farsakh maintains that this system imposes "on Palestinians similar conditions to those faced by blacks under the pass laws. Like the pass laws, the permit system controlled population movement according to the settlers' unilaterally defined considerations." In response to the Al-Aqsa Intifada, Israel modified the permit system and fragmented the WBGS [West Bank and Gaza Strip] territorially. "In April 2002 Israel declared that the WBGS would be cut into eight main areas, outside which Palestinians could not live without a permit."

John Dugard has said these laws "resemble, but in severity go far beyond, apartheid's pass system". Jamal Zahalka, an Israeli-Arab member of the Knesset has also said that this permit system is a feature of apartheid. Azmi Bishara, a former Knesset member, argued that the Palestinian situation had been caused by "colonialist apartheid".

In October 2005 the Israel Defense Forces stopped Palestinians from driving on Highway 60, as part of a plan for a separate road network for Palestinians and Israelis in the West Bank. The road had been sealed after the fatal shooting of three settlers near Bethlehem. As of 2005, no private Palestinian cars were permitted on the road although public transport was still allowed.

In 2011, Major General Nitzan Alon abolished separate public transportation systems on the West Bank, permitting Palestinians to ride alongside Israelis. Settlers have protested the measure. The IDF order was reportedly overturned by Moshe Ya'alon who, responding to pressure from settler groups, issued a directive that would deny Palestinians passage on buses running from Israel to the West Bank. In 2014, the decision was said to be made on security grounds, though according to Haaretz, military officials state that Palestinian use of such transport poses no security threat. Justice Minister Tzipi Livni asked Israeli Attorney General Yehuda Weinstein to examine the ban's legality and Weinstein immediately demanded that Ya'alon provide an explanation for his decision. Israeli security sources were quoted saying the decision had nothing to do with public buses and that the goal was to supervise entrance into and exit out of Israeli territory, thereby decreasing the chance of terrorist attacks inside Israel. Critics on the left called the policy tantamount to apartheid, and something that would render Israel a pariah state.

On 29 December 2009 Israel's High Court of Justice accepted the Association for Civil Rights in Israel's petition against an IDF order barring Palestinians from driving on Highway 443. The ruling was to come into effect five months after being issued, allowing Palestinians to use the road. According to plans the IDF laid out to implement the court's ruling, Palestinian use of the road was to remain limited. In March 2013, the Israeli Afikim bus company announced that, as of 4 March 2013, it would operate separate bus lines for Jews and Arabs in the occupied territories.

Comments from South Africans 
Anglican Archbishop and Nobel Peace Prize winner Desmond Tutu commented on the similarities between South Africa and Palestine and the importance of international pressure in ending apartheid in South Africa. He drew a parallel between the movement "aiming to end Israeli occupation" and the international pressure that helped end apartheid in South Africa, saying: "If apartheid ended, so can the occupation, but the moral force and international pressure will have to be just as determined." In 2014, Tutu urged the General Assembly of the Presbyterian Church in the United States to divest from companies that contributed to the occupation, saying that Israel "has created an apartheid reality within its borders and through its occupation", and that the alternative to Israel being "an apartheid state in perpetuity" was to end the occupation through either a one-state solution or a two-state solution.

Howard Friel writes that Tutu "views the conditions in the occupied Palestinian territories as resembling apartheid in South Africa." BBC News reported in 2012 that Tutu "accused Israel of practicing apartheid in its policies towards Palestinians." Both Friel and Israeli author Uri Davis have quoted the following comment from Tutu, published in the Guardian in 2002, in their own work: "I was deeply distressed in my visit to the Holy Land; it reminded me so much of what has happened to us black people in South Africa." Davis discusses Tutu's remark in his book Apartheid Israel: Possibilities for the Struggle Within, in which he argues that "fundamental apartheid structures of the Israeli polity" with respect to property inheritance rights, access to state land and water resources and access to state welfare resources "fully justify the classification of Israel as an apartheid State."

Other prominent South African anti-apartheid activists have used apartheid comparisons to criticize the occupation of the West Bank, and particularly the construction of the separation barrier. These include Farid Esack, a writer who is currently William Henry Bloomberg Visiting professor at Harvard Divinity School, Ronnie Kasrils, Winnie Madikizela-Mandela, Denis Goldberg, and Arun Gandhi.

In 2008, a delegation of African National Congress (ANC) veterans visited Israel and the Occupied Territories, and said that in some respects it was worse than apartheid. In May 2018, in the aftermath of the Gaza border protests, the ANC issued a statement comparing the actions of Palestinians to "our struggle against the apartheid regime". It also accused the Israeli military of "the same cruelty" as Hitler, and said that "all South Africans must rise up and treat Israel like the pariah that it is". Around the same time, the South African government withdrew indefinitely its ambassador to Israel, Sisa Ngombane, to protest "the indiscriminate and grave manner of the latest Israeli attack".

Human rights lawyer Fatima Hassan, a member of the 2008 ANC delegation, cited the separate roads, different registration of cars, the indignity of having to produce a permit, and long queues at checkpoints as worse than what black South Africans had experienced during apartheid. But she also thought the apartheid comparison was a potential "red herring": "the context is different and the debate on whether this is Apartheid or not deflects from the real issue of occupation, encroachment of more land, building of the wall and the indignity of the occupation and the conduct of the military and police. I saw the check point at Nablus, I met with Palestinians in Hebron, I met the villagers who are against the wall—I met Israelis and Palestinians who have lost family members, their land and homes. They have not lost hope though—and they believe in a joint struggle against the occupation and are willing in non-violent means to transform the daily direct and indirect forms of injustice and violence. To sum up, there is a transgression that is continuing unabated—call it what you want, apartheid/separation/closure/security—it remains a transgression".

Sasha Polakow-Suransky notes that Israel's labour policies are very different from those of apartheid-era South Africa, that Israel has never enacted miscegenation laws, and that liberation movements in South Africa and Palestine have had different "aspirations and tactics". Still, he argues that the apartheid analogy is likely to gain further legitimacy in coming years unless Israel moves to dismantle West Bank settlements and create a viable Palestinian state. Polakow-Suransky also writes that the response of Israel's defenders to the analogy since 2007 has been "knee-jerk" and based on "vitriol and recycled propaganda" rather than an honest assessment of the situation.

After the proposed Israeli annexation of the West Bank Benjamin Netanyahu announced in 2020, South-African born Israeli writer Benjamin Pogrund, a longtime critic of the analogy between Israeli occupational practices and apartheid, commented that if implemented, such a plan would alter his assessment: "[At] least it has been a military occupation. Now we are going to put other people under our control and not give them citizenship. That is apartheid. That is an exact mirror of what apartheid was [in South Africa]."

Response

Government reactions
In 1975, former US Ambassador to the United Nations (June 1975 – February 1976), Daniel Patrick Moynihan voiced the United States' strong disagreement with the General Assembly's resolution that "Zionism is a form of racism and racial discrimination", saying that unlike apartheid, Zionism is clearly not a racist ideology. He said that racist ideologies such as apartheid favor discrimination on the grounds of alleged biological differences, yet few people are as biologically heterogeneous as the Jews.

A number of sitting Israeli premiers have warned that Israel could become like apartheid South Africa. Prime minister Yitzhak Rabin warned in 1976 that Israel risked becoming an apartheid state if it annexed and absorbed the West Bank's Arab population. Prime minister Ehud Olmert in 2007 warned that if the two-state solution collapsed, Israel would "face a South African-style struggle for equal voting rights, and as soon as that happens, the state of Israel is finished".

In 2014, U.S. Secretary of State John Kerry warned that if Israel did not make peace soon with a two-state solution, it could become an apartheid state. Former South African state president F. W. de Klerk, who negotiated to end his country's apartheid regime, later said: "You have Palestinians living in Israel with full political rights. You don’t have discriminatory laws against them, I mean not letting them swim on certain beaches or anything like that. I think it's unfair to call Israel an apartheid state. If John Kerry did so, I think he made a mistake." The interviewer clarified that Kerry had stressed that Israel was not at present an apartheid state.

In February 2022, the Assembly of the African Union passed a resolution calling for the dismantlement of Israeli apartheid in the State of Palestine and recommended boycotting "the Israeli colonial system and illegal settlements" to end apartheid. In June 2022 the Catalan Parliament passed a resolution that "Israel commits the crime of apartheid against the Palestinian people" and calling upon the Generalitat de Catalunya to avoid any support for the apartheid regime and aid in implementing the recommendations of the Amnesty and Human Rights Watch reports.

In February 2022, The Times of Israel quoted a spokesperson for the UK's Foreign, Commonwealth and Development Office as saying "We do not agree with the use of this terminology".

Prime Minister Jean Castex of France read a speech on behalf of President Emmanuel Macron to the Representative Council of Jewish Institutions in France (CRIF) and said "How dare we talk about apartheid in a state where Arab citizens are represented in government and positions of leadership and responsibility?". In May 2021, then foreign minister Jean-Yves Le Drian warned of "the risk of 'long-lasting apartheid' in Israel in the event that the Palestinians fail to obtain their own state" and that "Even the status quo produces that". Commenting on the clashes between Arabs and Jews in some Israeli towns, he concluded that this "clearly shows that if in the future we had a solution other than the two-state solution, we would have the ingredients of long-lasting apartheid."

In February 2022, German Foreign Ministry spokesperson Christopher Burger said, "We reject expressions like apartheid or a one-sided focusing of criticism on Israel. That is not helpful to solving the conflict in the Middle East". In a joint press conference with Palestinian President Mahmoud Abbas in August 2022, German Chancellor Olaf Scholz rejected Abbas's comparison of Israel to apartheid and said "Regarding the Israeli politics we have a different assessment. I want to say clearly that I won't use the word 'apartheid' and I don't believe it is right to use the term to describe the situation".

In a July 2022 interview, US President Joe Biden was asked about "voices in the Democratic Party" who "say that Israel is an apartheid state, calling for an end of unconditional aid." He responded, "There are a few of them. I think they're wrong. I think they're making a mistake. Israel is a democracy. Israel is our ally."

On 26 July 2022, South African Foreign Minister Naledi Pandor said that Israel should be considered an apartheid state. In her remarks to the 2022 UNGA on 22 September 2022, she said, "We cannot ignore the words of the former Israeli negotiator at the Oslo talks, Daniel Levy, who addressed the UN Security Council recently and referred to 'the increasingly weighty body of scholarly, legal and public opinion that has designated Israel to be perpetrating apartheid in the territories under its control'."

Academic criticisms
Irwin Cotler, a retired Canadian politician and professor, said it was "Ideological antisemitism" (which he defined as antisemitism under the cover of anti-racism) to call Israel an apartheid state because "It also involves the call for the dismantling of Israel as an apartheid state as evidenced by the events at the 2001 UN World Conference against Racism in Durban" and linked this to efforts to delegitimize Israel.

Canadian academic, activist and a vocal supporter of Israel Anne Bayefsky wrote that Arab states used the apartheid label at the Durban World Conference against Racism 2001 as part of a campaign to delegitimize Israel and to legitimize violence against Israeli citizens.

Gideon Shimoni, professor emeritus of Hebrew University, has said that the analogy is defamatory and reflects a double standard when applied to Israel and not to neighboring Arab countries, whose policies towards their own Palestinian minorities have been described as discriminatory. He has said that while apartheid was characterized by racially based legal inequality and exploitation of Black Africans by the dominant Whites within a common society, the Israel–Palestinian conflict reflects "separate nationalisms," in which Israel refuses exploitation of Palestinians and on the contrary seeks separation and "divorce" from Palestinians for legitimate self-defense reasons.

Heribert Adam of Simon Fraser University and Kogila Moodley of the University of British Columbia, in their 2005 book-length study Seeking Mandela: Peacemaking Between Israelis and Palestinians, wrote that controversy over use of the term arises because Israel as a state is unique in the region. They write that Israel is perceived as a Western democracy and is thus likely to be judged by the standards of such a state. Israel also claims to be a home for the worldwide Jewish diaspora. Adam and Moodley note that Jewish historical suffering has imbued Zionism with a "subjective sense of moral validity" that the ruling white South Africans never had. They also suggested that academic comparisons between Israel and apartheid South Africa that see both dominant groups as settler societies leave unanswered the question of "when and how settlers become indigenous", as well as failing to take into account that Israeli's Jewish immigrants view themselves as returning home. Adam and Moodley write, "because people give meaning to their lives and interpret their worlds through these diverse ideological prisms, the perceptions are real and have to be taken seriously."

Other responses
On 9 September 2022, hundreds of Google and Amazon workers protested cloud contracts made with the Israeli government known as Project Nimbus. Some protesters in San Francisco held signs reading, "Another Google Worker Against Apartheid" and "No Tech For Apartheid". A week earlier, Ariel Koren, a Jewish Google employee, resigned, citing a hostile working environment after she spoke out against Project Nimbus. She said Google "systematically silences Palestinian, Jewish, Arab, and Muslim voices concerned about Google’s complicity in violations of Palestinian human rights". Other Palestinian employees claim "institutionalized bias" within Google, with one saying it had become impossible to express disagreement with Israel's treatment of Palestinians without "being called into a HR [sic] meeting with the threat of retaliation".

See also

References

Further reading

 Adam, Heribert and Kogila Moodley. Seeking Mandela : peacemaking between Israelis and Palestinians. Politics, history, and social change. Philadelphia: Temple University Press, 2005. , .
 Carter, Jimmy. Palestine: Peace Not Apartheid. Simon & Schuster, 2006. 
 Davis, Uri. Apartheid Israel: Possibilities for the Struggle Within. Zed Books, 2004. 

 

 Lavie, Smadar. 2003. "Lily White Feminism and Academic Apartheid in Israel: Anthropological Perspectives.” Anthropology Newsletter, October:10–11.

External links
 International Human Rights Clinic at Harvard Law School and Adameer Apartheid in the Occupied West Bank: A Legal Analysis of Israel’s Actions (PDF)
Anti-Defamation League Allegation: Israel is an Apartheid State

 
Political neologisms
Definition of racism controversy
Discrimination